The National Katyń Memorial is a monument in Baltimore, Maryland, which memorializes the victims of the 1940 Katyn massacre of Polish nationals carried out by Soviet forces. Baltimore's Polish-American community was instrumental in having the monument built. The monument was unveiled in 2000 and is the tallest statue in Baltimore. The statue itself is 44 feet (13.4 m) high, the whole monument, with base, is 56 feet (17 m).

The statue by sculptor Andrzej Pitynski was delivered from Poland and established in the Inner Harbor East at Aliceanna and President streets.

References

External links

Kaytn National Memorial Foundation

September 1995 Baltimore Sun article
May 1997 Baltimore Sun article
July 2003 Baltimore Sun article

2000 establishments in Maryland
2000 sculptures
Buildings and structures in Baltimore
Inner Harbor East, Baltimore
Katyn massacre memorials
Landmarks in Baltimore
Monuments and memorials in Maryland
Polish-American culture in Baltimore
Tourist attractions in Baltimore